The Adam Project is a 2022 American science fiction action comedy film co-produced by Skydance Media, Maximum Effort, and 21 Laps Entertainment. It was directed by Shawn Levy from a screenplay written by Jonathan Tropper, T.S. Nowlin, Jennifer Flackett and Mark Levin. The movie stars Ryan Reynolds, Walker Scobell, Mark Ruffalo, Jennifer Garner, Catherine Keener and Zoe Saldaña. The plot follows a fighter pilot (Reynolds) from the future, who goes back in time and encounters his younger self (Scobell).

Production on the film first began in 2012 with Tom Cruise attached to star. The film then fell into development hell until Netflix acquired the distribution rights. Filming commenced in November 2020 and wrapped in March 2021. The Adam Project began a limited "one night only" theatrical release on March 9, 2022 followed by its digital release on Netflix on March 11. The film received mixed reviews.

Plot
In a dystopian 2050, fighter pilot Adam Reed steals a time jet to escape to 2018 to save his wife, Laura. In the process, he gets injured and crash-lands in 2022. The story then shifts to 12-year-old Adam in 2022, whose father Louis died a year previously. He is bullied at school, gets suspended for fighting in school, and is distant from his mother Ellie. When he is home alone one night, he finds the injured future Adam. The younger Adam refuses to trust the stranger, but future Adam inadvertently mentions the names of both the younger Adam and his dog, Hawking. The younger Adam soon realizes that the stranger in front of him is his future self.

Due to a safety feature preventing him from flying because of his injuries, Adam must bring along the younger Adam and use his DNA to enter his jet. They both are soon attacked by Maya Sorian, the leader of the dystopian world, and her assistant Christos, but are saved by Laura, who had faked her death and stayed off-grid in an unknown location. After surviving the attack and comparing notes, Laura and the Adams realize that after the invention of time travel by Louis Reed and his subsequent death, Sorian had monopolized the discovery. During her visit to 2018, Laura learned Sorian frequently came and advised her past self in order to secure her future wealth and power. To protect her secret, Sorian ordered Laura's death. Although Laura survived the assassination attempt, destruction of her time jet left her stranded in the past. The sudden arrival of Sorian's goons interrupts the reunion, and Laura fights off the attack long enough for the two Adams to escape to 2018.

In 2018, the Adams meet Louis Reed in an attempt to enlist his help, but their father refuses any assistance out of concern for the effect on the time stream. That night, Sorian meets and warns her past self about Adam. Meanwhile, the Adams share their common feelings about their father in a motel. The next day, they both set off to destroy the time travel machine. On arrival at Sorian Technologies, they are attacked by Sorian's soldiers, but are unexpectedly saved by Louis, who has changed his mind and agrees to guide them. Louis reveals that destroying the machine will not destroy time travel as long as Sorian has his algorithm with all the math and constraints to control the process. Meanwhile, 2050 Sorian captures the younger Adam.

Although Louis and 2050 Adam remove a memory unit with the algorithm, both Sorians arrive and threaten 2022 Adam as leverage to coerce Louis into surrendering the algorithm. 2050 Adam stalls and allows 2022 Adam to escape from Sorian by pushing her gun away, but an errant bullet damages the seal restraining the electromagnetic field, causing it to grow to limitless values. The Reeds try as much as they can to stop them, but the older Sorian threatens to kill Louis. Adam warns that her bullets are armor-piercing, but Louis remains adamant. Seeing no other way, Sorian shoots at Louis, but the path of the bullet is altered by the electromagnetic field and hits 2018 Sorian instead, killing her and wiping both Sorians out of existence.

The Reeds barely manage to escape the facility's implosion and reach home, where they reconcile by playing a game of catch before the Adams return to their respective times. In 2022, the younger Adam lives in a new timeline where he never got suspended, has let go of his anger, and gives his mother a hug via an "echo". Sometime in the future, an older and much happier Adam meets Laura during a flight training lecture where she realizes, to Adam's amusement, she has entered the wrong building on the campus. Adam offers to walk her to her building, stating that he has got time, and they depart together.

Cast
 Ryan Reynolds as Adam Reed (2050), a time pilot who risks his life to try and uncover the truth behind his wife's disappearance.
 Walker Scobell as 12-year-old Adam (2022), a bullied, asthmatic sixth grader.
 Isaiah Haegert as 8-year-old Adam (2018).
 Mark Ruffalo as Louis Reed, Adam's father and a brilliant quantum physicist who wrote the algorithm necessary for controlled time travel. Reed died in 2021 in a car accident, and Adam still suffers from depression.
 Jennifer Garner as Ellie Reed, Adam's mother. Garner also portrays her younger self in 2018.
 Catherine Keener as Maya Sorian, a businesswoman who funded Louis' research and later took advantage of his death to monopolize it for her own benefit and create a future where she is the most powerful woman in the world.
 Keener also portrays her younger self through de-aging, with Lucie Guest as her body double.
 Zoe Saldaña as Laura Shane, Adam's wife and a fellow time pilot left stranded in 2018 after a failed attempt on her life. Saldaña also portrays her alternate version in the changed timeline.
 Alex Mallari Jr. as Christos, Adam and Laura's former colleague, now a ruthless security enforcer employed by Sorian.
 Ben Wilkinson as Derek, Ellie’s new boyfriend.

Production

The project, a spec script written by T.S. Nowlin, was initially announced as Our Name Is Adam in October 2012. Paramount Pictures became interested in acquiring the film, and Tom Cruise was attached to star.

The film was revived in July 2020 when it moved to Netflix, with Shawn Levy as director and Ryan Reynolds set to star after previously collaborating on Free Guy (2021), while the latest draft of the script was written by Jonathan Tropper, from previous drafts by Nowlin, Jennifer Flackett and Mark Levin. In November, Jennifer Garner, Zoe Saldana, Mark Ruffalo, Catherine Keener, Alex Mallari Jr. and Walker Scobell were added to the cast.

Filming commenced in November 2020 in Vancouver, British Columbia, Canada. Filming officially wrapped in March 2021.

Rob Simonsen composed the score. A track from the film titled "The Adam Project" was released as a single on March 3, 2022.

Release
The film began a limited theatrical release only on March 9, 2022 at 7:00PM Eastern Standard Time followed by its release on Netflix on March 11.

Reception

Audience viewership 
According to Samba TV, 3 million US households watched The Adam Project in its first weekend streaming on Netflix. Samba TV also showed that 384,000 households watched the film within the first 3-days of that period.

Critical response 
 

Ryan Leston of IGN gave it 9 out of 10 and called it a mash-up of Back to the Future and The Last Starfighter. He praised Reynolds for his performance and Scobell for his debut performance. Owen Gleiberman of Variety wrote: "The movie is a total trifle, but it’s often a diverting one — a wide-eyed sci-fi adventure with a screwball buoyancy."

Accolades

References

External links
 
 

2022 science fiction action films
2022 action adventure films
2020s American films
2020s English-language films
21 Laps Entertainment films
American science fiction action films
American action adventure films
English-language Netflix original films
Films about father–son relationships
Films about mother–son relationships
Films about time travel
Films directed by Shawn Levy
Films produced by Ryan Reynolds
Films scored by Rob Simonsen
Films set in Seattle
Films set in Washington (state)
Films shot in Vancouver
Skydance Media films
Films set in 2018
Films set in 2022
Films set in 2050